The 2020 United States Senate election in Idaho was held on November 3, 2020, to elect a member of the United States Senate to represent the State of Idaho, concurrently with the 2020 U.S. presidential election, as well as other elections to the United States Senate, elections to the United States House of Representatives and various state and local elections.

Incumbent Republican Senator Jim Risch won reelection to a third term in office, defeating Democratic nominee Paulette Jordan, who, percentage wise, had the worst performance of a Democratic senatorial candidate for this seat since 2002. However, Risch also performed nearly three points worse than he did when he was reelected in 2014, and additionally, he slightly underperformed incumbent President Donald Trump's performance in the concurrent presidential election.

Republican primary

Candidates

Nominee
 Jim Risch, incumbent U.S. Senator

Results

Democratic primary

Candidates

Nominee
Paulette Jordan, former state representative and nominee for Governor of Idaho in 2018

Eliminated in primary

Withdrawn
Nancy Harris, businesswoman (endorsed Jordan)
 Travis Oler, farmer and U.S. Army veteran (ran for state house) (endorsed Vandermaas)

Declined
 A.J. Balukoff, Boise School District board member, nominee for Governor of Idaho in 2014, and candidate for Governor of Idaho in 2018 (endorsed Vandermaas)
 Mark Nye, state senator
 Michelle Stennett, minority leader of the Idaho Senate

Endorsements

Results

Other candidates

Constitution Party

Nominee
Ray Writz

Independents

Declared
Natalie Fleming, software developer

General election

Predictions

Endorsements

Polling

Results 

Counties that flipped from Republican to Democratic
 Latah (largest municipality: Moscow)
 Teton (largest municipality: Victor)

See also
 2020 Idaho elections

Notes
Partisan clients

References

External links
 
 
  (State affiliate of the U.S. League of Women Voters)
 

Official campaign websites
 Natalie Fleming (I) for Senate
 Paulette Jordan (D) for Senate
 Jim Risch (R) for Senate
 Ray Writz (C) for Senate

2020
Idaho
United States Senate